Holy Name of Jesus Catholic Church in San Francisco is a parish of the Archdiocese of San Francisco in San Francisco, California, United States, one of four Catholic churches in San Francisco's Sunset District. The church is distinctive because of its modern architecture and large size, and can be seen up the hill from nearby Ocean Beach.

The parish was established in 1925 with Father Richard J. Ryan as its first pastor. A temporary structure served as the first church in 1926. Growth of the parish forced a new building to be constructed and built at the corner of Lawton Street and 40th Avenue. Also being built was a parish school. Both facilities opened in 1941. The parish continued to grow, and the school was expanded to accommodate a total of 800 students.

With continued growth of the parish, a new church was necessary. In 1965, the current Holy Name church was rebuilt. To make space for the current church, the rectory building had to literally be lifted off of its foundation, loaded onto a truck, and moved across the street. With the new church in place, the old church was converted into a gymnasium/auditorium, named Ryan Hall after the parish's first pastor. Today, the parish and school continues to serve the people of the Sunset.

References

External links
Holy Name's Official Website

Roman Catholic churches in San Francisco
Roman Catholic churches in California
Roman Catholic Archdiocese of San Francisco
Christian organizations established in 1925
Roman Catholic churches completed in 1964
20th-century Roman Catholic church buildings in the United States